Herrera is a genus of cicadas in the family Cicadidae. There are about seven described species in Herrera.

Species
These seven species belong to the genus Herrera:
 Herrera ancilla (Stål, 1864) i c g
 Herrera coyamensis Sanborn, 2007 i c g
 Herrera humilastrata Sanborn & Heath, 2014 c g
 Herrera infuscata Sanborn, 2009 i c g
 Herrera laticapitata Davis, 1938 i c g
 Herrera lugubrina (Stål, 1864) i c g
 Herrera umbraphila Sanborn & Heath, 2014 c g
Data sources: i = ITIS, c = Catalogue of Life, g = GBIF, b = Bugguide.net

References

Further reading

 
 
 
 
 
 

Carinetini
Cicadidae genera